Azurite is a soft, deep-blue copper mineral produced by weathering of copper ore deposits. During the early 19th century, it was also known as chessylite, after the type locality at Chessy-les-Mines near Lyon, France. The mineral, a basic carbonate with the chemical formula Cu3(CO3)2(OH)2, has been known since ancient times, and was mentioned in Pliny the Elder's Natural History under the Greek name  (κυανός: "deep blue," root of English cyan) and the Latin name caeruleum. Copper (Cu2+) gives it its blue color. Since antiquity, azurite's exceptionally deep and clear blue has been associated with low-humidity desert and winter skies. The modern English name of the mineral reflects this association, since both azurite and azure are derived via Arabic from the Persian  (لاژورد), an area known for its deposits of another deep-blue stone, lapis lazuli ("stone of azure").

Mineralogy

Azurite has the formula Cu3(CO3)2(OH)2, with the copper(II) cations linked to two different anions, carbonate and hydroxide. It is one of two relatively common basic copper(II) carbonate minerals, the other being bright green malachite. Aurichalcite is a rare basic carbonate of copper and zinc. Simple copper carbonate (CuCO3) is not known to exist in nature, due to the high affinity of the  ion for the hydroxide anion .

Azurite crystallizes in the monoclinic system.  Large crystals are dark blue, often prismatic. Azurite specimens can be massive to nodular or can occur as drusy crystals lining a cavity. 

Azurite is soft, with a Mohs hardness of only 3.5 to 4. The specific gravity of azurite is 3.77. Azurite is destroyed by heat, losing carbon dioxide and water to form black, copper(II) oxide powder. Characteristic of a carbonate, specimens effervesce upon treatment with hydrochloric acid. The combination of deep blue color and effervescence when moistened with hydrochloric acid are identifying characteristics of the mineral.

Color
The optical properties (color, intensity) of minerals such as azurite and malachite are characteristic of copper(II). Many coordination complexes of copper(II) exhibit similar colors. According to crystal field theory, the color results from low energy d-d transitions associated with the d9 metal center.

Weathering
Azurite is unstable in open air compared to malachite, and often is pseudomorphically replaced by malachite. This weathering process involves the replacement of some of the carbon dioxide (CO2) units with water (H2O), changing the carbonate:hydroxide ratio of azurite from 1:1 to the 1:2 ratio of malachite:

 2 Cu3(CO3)2(OH)2 + H2O → 3 Cu2(CO3)(OH)2 + CO2

From the above equation, the conversion of azurite into malachite is attributable to the low partial pressure of carbon dioxide in air.

Azurite is quite stable under ordinary storage conditions, so that specimens retain their deep blue color for long periods of time.

Occurrences

Azurite is found in the same geologic settings as its sister mineral, malachite, though it is usually less abundant. Both minerals occur widely as supergene copper minerals, formed in the oxidized zone of copper ore deposits. Here they are associated with cuprite, native copper, and various iron oxide minerals.

Fine specimens can be found at many locations. Similar rosettes are found at Chessy, Rhône, France. Other notable occurrences are in Utah; Mexico; the Ural and Altai Mountains; Sardinia; Laurion, Greece; Wallaroo, South Australia; and Broken Hill.

Uses

Pigments

Azurite is unstable in air. However it was used as a blue pigment in antiquity. Azurite is naturally occurring in Sinai and the Eastern Desert of Egypt. It was reported by F. C. J. Spurrell (1895) in the following examples; a shell used as a pallet in a Fourth Dynasty (2613 to 2494 BCE) context in Meidum, a cloth over the face of a Fifth Dynasty (2494 to 2345 BCE) mummy also at Meidum and a number of Eighteenth Dynasty (1543–1292 BCE) wall paintings. Depending on the degree of fineness to which it was ground, and its basic content of copper carbonate, it gave a wide range of blues. It has been known as mountain blue or Armenian stone, in addition it was formerly known as Azurro Della Magna (from Italian). When mixed with oil it turns slightly green. When mixed with egg yolk it turns green-grey. It is also known by the names blue bice and blue verditer, though verditer usually refers to a pigment made by chemical process. Older examples of azurite pigment may show a more greenish tint due to weathering into malachite. Much azurite was mislabeled lapis lazuli, a term applied to many blue pigments. As chemical analysis of paintings from the Middle Ages improves, azurite is being recognized as a major source of the blues used by medieval painters. Lapis lazuli (the pigment ultramarine) was chiefly supplied from Afghanistan during the Middle Ages, whereas azurite was a common mineral in Europe at the time. Sizable deposits were found near Lyons, France. It was mined since the 12th century in Saxony, in the silver mines located there.

Heating can be used to distinguish azurite from purified natural ultramarine blue, a more expensive but more stable blue pigment, as described by Cennino D'Andrea Cennini. Ultramarine withstands heat, whereas azurite converts to black copper oxide. However, gentle heating of azurite produces a deep blue pigment used in Japanese painting techniques.

Azurite pigment can be synthesized by precipitating copper(II) hydroxide from a solution of copper(II) chloride with lime (calcium hydroxide) and treating the precipitate with a concentrated solution of potassium carbonate and lime. This pigment is likely to contain traces of basic copper(II) chlorides.

Jewelry
Azurite is used occasionally as beads and as jewelry, and also as an ornamental stone. However, its softness and tendency to lose its deep blue color as it weathers leaves it with fewer uses. Heating destroys azurite easily, so all mounting of azurite specimens must be done at room temperature.

Collecting
The intense color of azurite makes it a popular collector's stone. The notion that specimens must be carefully protected from bright light, heat, and open air to retain their intensity of color over time may be an urban legend. Paul E. Desautels, former curator of gems and minerals at the Smithsonian Institution, has written that azurite is stable under ordinary storage conditions.

Prospecting
While not a major ore of copper itself, the presence of azurite is a good surface indicator of the presence of weathered copper sulfide ores. It is usually found in association with the chemically similar malachite, producing a striking color combination of deep blue and bright green that is strongly indicative of the presence of copper ores.

History
Azurite was known in the pre-classical ancient world.  It was used in ancient Egypt as a pigment, obtained from mines in Sinai.  Ancient Mesopotamian writers report the use of a special mortar and pestle for grinding it.  It does not appear to have been used in ancient Roman wall paintings but Roman writers certainly knew about its use as a pigment.  The fusing of glass and azurite was developed in ancient Mesopotamia.

Gallery of azurite mineral specimens

See also
 Basic copper carbonate
 List of inorganic pigments
 List of minerals
 Blue pigments

References

External links

 Azurite, Colourlex

Carbonate minerals
Copper ores
Gemstones
Monoclinic minerals
Minerals in space group 14